The 2013 Penrith Panthers season was the 47th in the club's history. Coached by Ivan Cleary and captained by Kevin Kingston, the team competed in the National Rugby League's 2013 Telstra Premiership. They finished the regular season 10th (out of 16), failing to reach the finals for the third consecutive year.

A report conducted by Brand Finance valued the Penrith Panthers club at $46.2m, the highest of any Australian sporting brand.

Squad

Player transfers 
A † denotes that the transfer occurred during the 2013 season.

Jersey and Sponsors

In 2013 the Panthers had changed jersey suppliers, ending the relationship with supplier ISC, and starting a new apparel agreement with ASICS. They retained their predominantly black home jerseys from 2012, with minor changes to the collar, mainly due to the change in supplier. The alternate jersey was predominantly white with teal hoops around the midsection, though this jersey was seldom used in 2013, instead opting to use the Women in League jersey for away fixtures which is pink in color. The heritage jersey used was the 1967 white 'V' on brown design.

OAK were again the major sponsor of the Panthers in 2013. Hertz were announced as the sleeve sponsor for 2013. Tony Ferguson Weight Loss was located on the lower back of the jersey. Tooheys New and HostPlus were short sponsors for 2013.

Fixtures 
The Panthers again use Centrebet Stadium as their home ground in 2013, their home ground since they entered the competition in 1967. In Round 17 Penrith got their largest ever win over the Gold Coast Titans, winning 40–18.

Pre-season

Regular season

Ladder

Other teams
In addition to competing in the National Rugby League, the Panthers also fielded semi-professional teams in the National Youth Competition's 2013 Holden Cup (for players aged under 20) and the New South Wales Rugby League's 2013 New South Wales Cup, where the team was known as the Windsor Wolves. The NYC team was captained by Tony Satini.

Representative

Domestic

International 

1 – Daniela was ruled out by injury.
2 – Segeyaro was ruled out of the tournament by a shoulder injury.

References

External links
Panthers official site

Penrith Panthers seasons
Penrith Panthers season